Arctia ornata is a moth in the family Erebidae. It was described by Otto Staudinger in 1896. It is found in the Russian Far East (Yenisei River, Altai, Sayan, Tuva, Transbaikalia, Yakutia, southern Magadan) and Mongolia.

This species was formerly a member of the genus Platarctia, but was moved to Arctia along with the other species of the genera Acerbia, Pararctia, Parasemia, Platarctia, and Platyprepia.

Subspecies
Arctia ornata ornata
Arctia ornata sotavaltai Dubatolov, 1996 (Russia: mountains eastern Yakutia, southern Magadan)

References

Moths described in 1896
Arctiina